Sonny Kittel (born 6 January 1993) is a German footballer who plays as an attacking midfielder for 2. Bundesliga club Hamburger SV.

Career
After winning the German U17 championship with Eintracht Frankfurt in June 2010, Kittel was capped in the professional squad for the 2010–11 season. In Eintracht's first competitive match at SV Wilhelmshaven he was substituted. In the first 2010–11 home match he was also given some game time when he was substituted on for Caio in the 84th minute.

After playing for 2. Bundesliga side FC Ingolstadt for three seasons, Kittel transferred to Hamburger SV on 18 June 2019, signing a four year-contract.

International career
Kittel presented the Germany national youth football team on U16, U17, U18 and U20 level. In December 2017 he expressed his desire to play for the Poland national football team as his parents come from Poland.

Honours
Individual
 Fritz Walter Medal U18 Silver: 2011

References

External links
 
 

1993 births
Living people
German footballers
Germany youth international footballers
Association football midfielders
VfB Marburg players
Eintracht Frankfurt players
Eintracht Frankfurt II players
FC Ingolstadt 04 players
Hamburger SV players
Bundesliga players
2. Bundesliga players
German people of Polish descent